Fabio Delvino (born 1 March 1998) is an Italian footballer who plays as a defender for  side Fidelis Andria.

Club career
Delvino was born in Bari. He played football for various youth teams, playing 26 fourth-tier matches. He made his professional debut, in the Bisceglie, in the 2017–18 season of Serie C, on 16 September 2017 against Catanzaro, coming on as a substitute for Andrea Petta in the 31st minute. He signed to Alessandria on 13 September 2018. 

On 24 June 2019, he signed a 2-year contract with Virtus Francavilla.

On 25 August 2022, Delvino returned to his youth club Fidelis Andria.

References

Sources
 
 

1998 births
Living people
Footballers from Bari
Association football defenders
Italian footballers
S.S.C. Bari players
S.S. Fidelis Andria 1928 players
A.S. Bisceglie Calcio 1913 players
A.S.D. Barletta 1922 players
Matera Calcio players
U.S. Alessandria Calcio 1912 players
Virtus Francavilla Calcio players
Serie C players
Serie D players